Gowdali Sallakh (also Romanized as Gowdālī Sallākh; also known as Gowdār Sallāḩ, Godālī-ye Sallākh), and Sallākh is a village in Badranlu Rural District, in the Central District of Bojnord County, North Khorasan Province, Iran. At the 2006 census, its population was 80, in 20 families.

References 

Populated places in Bojnord County